The Devil's Tomb is a 2009 American horror film, directed by Jason Connery. It stars Cuba Gooding Jr., Ray Winstone and Ron Perlman. The film was released direct–to–video on May 26, 2009.

Plot

An elite group of Special Operations soldiers, led by Captain "Mack", are sent by Dr. Elissa Cardell, a CIA operative, to rescue her father, scientist Lee Wesley, from an archaeological dig in the Middle Eastern desert. The dig site was a suspected bunker for WMDs. After entering the dig site, they encounter a priest who has strange boils all over his body. The team's medic, "Doc" Sarah Harrington, sedates him. I.T. Specialist and former hacker Click uses the dig site's terminal to activate the elevator and notices something codenamed the Gehenna Project. Cardell denies knowing about it. All communications from the site have been disabled and the wiring cut. Mack orders Communications Specialist Nickels to stay to fix the commo and watch the priest while the rest of the team takes the elevator deeper into the dig site.

After exiting the elevator, they encounter Duncan, a scientist with strange boils like the priest, pale colored eyes and an unnatural voice. Duncan confronts Doc about her religious beliefs while saying her full name to her. Duncan attacks Hammer by spitting an acidic, black goo at him but is shot in the chest by Mack. While treating Duncan's wound, Doc has a hallucination of her sister; angry at Doc for letting her die. Duncan and Doc disappear but the team uses Doc's tracking device to follow them. The team splits up and Yoshi follows a hallucination of her and Hicks's unborn daughter. The team runs into Duncan, who is trying to open the door to the safe room. Duncan yells at the team about their ignorance of salvation and Mack shoots him in the head, which strangely doesn't kill him. The entire team shoots him and he finally dies.

The door to the safety room is opened from the inside, revealing Fulton, a priest that Cardell knows. Fulton tells them that Doc was probably taken to the temple and reluctantly agrees to take them there. The team notices that Yoshi is missing and, when they find her, she tells them of her hallucination. Fulton explains that the possessed use visions to tempt humans. Mack then duct-tapes Fulton's mouth shut. Nickels hallucinates a nude woman and is attacked by the priest; he fights back with a knife but has his arm broken and the priest spits a dark fluid into his mouth, then drags him away.

Separated from the team, Click encounters Doc locked in a room. While trying to help her, he is attacked by a possessed scientist. Hammer shows up and rescues Click, but more possessed start to appear. Hammer decides to throw explosives at the group, causing the passage to collapse. The team arrives at the temple and learn from Fulton and Cardell that the scientists are possessed because of absorbing the spirit of one of the Nephilim, which is frozen in the temple to prevent it from escaping. Fulton explains that the dig site is one of many tombs created by God to imprison Nephilim. In the meantime, Yoshi follows the hallucination to a now possessed Doc. She seduces Yoshi and allows her to lick strange, infectious boils on her shoulder, possessing her. Doc then cuts Yoshi's back open. When the team notices that Yoshi is missing, Hicks and Hammer try to find her. During their search, a possessed Doc attacks Hammer, who aims his gun at her after noticing that she has developed boils. Hicks points his gun at Hammer, who tries to tell Hicks that Doc is possessed. Hicks does not believe him and shoots at Hammer, who manages to run away.

Hicks then chases Doc and finds Yoshi, whose spine is exposed. He tries to help her but she attacks him as Doc rips his throat out. Hammer arrives back at the temple to tell Mack about Doc and Hicks.

Fulton realizes that, with Click's unintentional help, Cardell activated the Gehenna Project, which is a self-destruct device for the dig site. He runs for the elevator alone. The soldiers only have fifteen minutes to get to the elevator before the explosion. The door to the temple slowly starts closing. Mack, Cardell, and Click make it out of the temple but Hammer gets locked in. Surrounded by possessed scientists, he puts up a fight, but is overwhelmed and sets off his grenades, killing himself and the possessed scientists attacking him. While running away, Fulton is pushed into barbed wire by Doc, who then slits his throat.

Mack, Cardell, and Click arrive at the area where they encountered Duncan for the first time and meet up with Wesley. He is possessed but does not have the boils. Doc and Nickels, who is now possessed, arrive and Mack and Click shoot him and a few other possessed until the possessed priest grabs Click, drags him away and kills him. Mack has a hallucination of his old best friend Blakeley, who Mack was ordered to murder years ago. Mack resists and shoots an explosive barrel next to Wesley which burns him and kills Doc, along with the hallucination of Blakeley. Cardell stands over Wesley and sets his soul free by taking the Nephilim into herself. When Mack tells her that they have to leave, she refuses, saying that her goal was to set her father's soul free. Mack makes it to the elevator alone and escapes from the dig site seconds before the explosion. Mack is then picked up by the helicopter and realizes that he has a new purpose in the world. He is a new soldier in an ancient war against the evil Nephilim.

Cast

Production
Filming began in California from November 2007 to January 2008, on a $10 million budget. The film received an R rating from the MPAA for strong violence/gore, language and brief nudity.

Home media
The DVD was released on May 26, 2009 in United States, distributed by DreamWorks Pictures. The special features included on the disk are a directors commentary, outtakes, a making of documentary, deleted scenes and alternate scenes. As of August 14, 2009, it had sold 159,568 copies and grossed $3,189,764 in sales.

The DVD was released in Australia on December 9, 2009.

References

External links
 
 

2009 films
2009 direct-to-video films
2009 horror films
2009 independent films
American supernatural horror films
American independent films
Direct-to-video horror films
2000s supernatural horror films
Films directed by Jason Connery
2000s English-language films
2000s American films
Sony Pictures direct-to-video films